WZBN (105.5 FM) is a Christian radio station, owned by Greater 2nd Mt. Olive Baptist Church,  serving metro Albany, Georgia with a traditional gospel and urban contemporary gospel music format, under the brand: Praise 105.5 FM...Albany's Gospel Leader.  Its studios are located at Albany Towers in Albany and the transmitter is located north of Camilla, Georgia.

On November 28, 2022 WZBN began simulcasting on WGSW 106.9 FM Americus and rebranded as "Praise 105.5 & 106.9".

References

External links

Radio stations established in 1979
Gospel radio stations in the United States
1979 establishments in Georgia (U.S. state)
ZBN